David S. Tatel (born March 16, 1942) is an American lawyer who serves as a Senior United States circuit judge of the United States Court of Appeals for the District of Columbia Circuit.

Education and career 
Tatel received his Bachelor of Arts from the University of Michigan and his Juris Doctor from the University of Chicago Law School.

After graduating from law school, he served as an instructor at the University of Michigan Law School before joining Sidley Austin in Chicago. He served as founding director of the Chicago Lawyers' Committee for Civil Rights Under Law, Director of the National Lawyers' Committee for Civil Rights Under Law, and Director of the Office for Civil Rights of the United States Department of Health, Education, and Welfare during the Carter Administration. Returning to private practice in 1979, Tatel joined Hogan & Hartson, where he founded and headed the firm's education practice until his appointment to the D.C. Circuit. While on sabbatical from Hogan & Hartson, Tatel spent a year as a lecturer at Stanford Law School. He also previously served as Acting General Counsel for the Legal Services Corporation.

Federal judicial service
Tatel was nominated by President Bill Clinton on June 20, 1994, to a seat on the U.S. Court of Appeals for the District of Columbia Circuit vacated by Judge Ruth Bader Ginsburg. He was confirmed by the United States Senate on October 6, 1994, by a voice vote, and received commission on October 7, 1994. He announced his intent to assume senior status upon confirmation of a successor on February 12, 2021. Tatel assumed senior status on May 16, 2022.

In June 2017, Tatel found the Foreign Sovereign Immunities Act did not prevent the survivors of a Holocaust victim from suing to recover art stolen by Nazi plunderers, over the partial dissent of Senior Judge A. Raymond Randolph.

In October 2019, Tatel filed the majority opinion in Trump v. Mazars USA, LLP, finding that the U.S. House of Representatives Committee on Oversight and Reform had the authority to compel Mazars, via subpoena, to produce documents relating to the personal financial information of President Donald Trump, including several years' worth of income tax returns. That decision was vacated and remanded, 7–2, by the Supreme Court in an opinion written by Chief Justice John Roberts on July 9, 2020.

Personal life
Tatel serves as co-chair of the National Academy of Sciences' Committee on Science, Technology, and Law. He is a member of the American Philosophical Society and the American Academy of Arts and Sciences. He serves on the Trustee Board of the Foundation Fighting Blindness. He chaired the Board of The Spencer Foundation from 1990 to 1997 and the Board of The Carnegie Foundation for the Advancement of Teaching from 2005 to 2009.

Tatel and his wife, Edith, have had four children and eight grandchildren.

Tatel has been blind since 1972 due to retinitis pigmentosa. His guide dog, Vixen, is a German Shepherd.

Selected publications and speeches
Tatel, David S. (September 13, 1997). Alexander F. Morrison Lecture. Annual Meeting of the California State Bar, San Diego, CA
Tatel, David S. (June 25, 2002). Remarks of David S. Tatel on the Occasion of the Spencer Foundation's 30th Anniversary Dinner. Chicago, IL
Tatel, David S. (October 16, 2003). Remarks on the Occasion of the Portrait Hanging Ceremony for the Honorable Patricia Wald. Washington, D.C.
Tatel, David S. (January 19, 2004). Macalester College Graduation Ceremony Speech. St. Paul, MN
Tatel, David S., "Madison Lecture: Judicial Methodology, Southern School Desegregation, and the Rule of Law, 79 N.Y.U. L. Rev. 1071 (2004).
Tatel, David S. (October 27, 2006). “Remarks on the Occasion of the Portrait Hanging Ceremony for the Honorable Stephen F. Williams”. Washington, D.C.
Tatel, David S. (November 15, 2008). Remarks of David S. Tatel. The American Philosophical Society, Philadelphia, PA
Tatel, David S. (January 17, 2009). Litigation and Integration Then and Now. Delivered at Passing the Torch: the Past, Present, and Future of Interdistrict School Desegregation, Harvard Law School, Cambridge, MA
Tatel, David S. (December 8, 2009). Remarks on the Occasion of the Portrait Hanging Ceremony for the Honorable James Robertson. Washington, D.C.
Tatel, David S. (April 23, 2012). Habeas Corpus: Remarks of Judge David S. Tatel. Cosmos Club, Washington, D.C.
Tatel, David S. (April 5, 2013). Remarks on the Occasion of the Portrait Hanging Ceremony for the Honorable David B. Sentelle. Washington, D.C.
Tatel, David S. (November 15, 2013). Remarks of David S. Tatel''. The American Philosophical Society, Philadelphia, PA

See also
List of first minority male lawyers and judges in the United States

References

External links

White House press release announcing Tatel's nomination
Official D.C. Circuit Biography

Finding aid to the David S. Tatel papers at the Library of Congress

1942 births
Living people
20th-century American judges
21st-century American judges
American civil rights lawyers
American blind people
Judges of the United States Court of Appeals for the D.C. Circuit
People from Washington, D.C.
United States court of appeals judges appointed by Bill Clinton
University of Chicago Law School alumni
University of Michigan Law School faculty
University of Michigan alumni